Marco Piccinni (born 19 April 1987) is an Italian footballer who plays as a midfielder for  club Monopoli.

Career
Born in Bari, Italy, Piccinni started his career at hometown club A.S. Bari. After made his debut in the last rounds of 2005–06 Serie B (round 40 of 42 rounds season), he was loaned to Pro Vasto but returned in January 2007 for Bari youth team. He only played for Pro Vasto in 2006–07 Coppa Italia. He then sold to Noicattaro in co-ownership deal. In June 2009 he returned to Bari but in July left for Brindisi.

He failed to find a club to borrow him in 2011. He wore no.95 of Bari, which in recent years only players that excluded from the coach plan would wore "large" number in Bari. FIGC only allowed players to wear number from 1 to 99. Along with Conti (93), Langella (94), Statella (96), Rana (97) and Visconti (98), they were not part of the plan of Bari's first team. In January 2012, Piccinni left for Piacenza without a single appearance for Bari in 2011–12 Serie B season.

In 2012, he joined Barletta. On 13 August 2013 he joined Chieti.

In July 2014 Piccinni signed with the Serie D side Fidelis Andria. After winning the championship, he renewed his contract with Fidelis Andria by signing a 1-year deal, with option for a 2nd year, for the 2015-16 Lega Pro season. At the end of the season, he signed a new 1-year deal for season 2016-17 with Fidelis Andria.

On 2 September 2019, he signed a 2-year contract with Monopoli.

References

External links
 

1987 births
Living people
Footballers from Bari
Italian footballers
Association football midfielders
Serie B players
Serie C players
Lega Pro Seconda Divisione players
Serie D players
S.S.C. Bari players
Vastese Calcio 1902 players
A.S. Noicattaro Calcio players
S.S.D. Città di Brindisi players
S.S.D. Lucchese 1905 players
Piacenza Calcio 1919 players
A.S.D. Barletta 1922 players
S.S. Chieti Calcio players
S.S. Fidelis Andria 1928 players
Potenza Calcio players
S.S. Monopoli 1966 players